Tuborg Pilsener Spor Kulübü (in English: Tuborg Pilsener Sports Club) was a professional basketball club based in İzmir, Turkey.

History
The club was founded in 1971 in İzmir, under the name Izmir Swimming Specialization Club Association ("İzmir Yüzme İhtisas Kulübü Derneği") as a specialized sports club. On May 23, 1978 the club was included in the Yaşar Holding Club and has been named Tuborg Swimming Specialization Club Association. In 1989 the club adopted the name Spring Swimming Specialization Club-Society and in 1992 renamed to Tuborg S.K. changed as the club is primarily funded by the company that bears the name and supported.

Swimming branches present the first club since its inception in 1981, Table Tennis, Volleyball in 1982, the basketball branch was established in 1993. Although the volleyball section closed in 1990 and the tennis section in 1996, Tuborg S.K. continued its activities with swimming and basketball branches until 1999. On this date Troy Pilsner S.K. and Pinar S.K. is divided in two. On July 18, 2003 the club changed its name to Tuborg Pilsener after this date only successful young people are continuing to sports activities with basketball branches that grow from the bottom structure to Turkish basketball, and has scored many successes.

Tuborg Pilsener, after the 2005–06 season, has decided to withdraw from Turkish League.

Honours
FIBA EuroCup Challenge
Third place: 2003–04

References

External links
TBLStat.net Profile

Turkish Basketball Super League teams
Defunct basketball teams in Turkey
Basketball teams established in 1993
Basketball teams disestablished in 2006